There were seven Independent Liberal-Progressive candidates in the 1953 Manitoba provincial election.  Two of these candidates were endorsed by the official party.  The other five were not, and competed against official Liberal-Progressive candidates.

Fred Klym registered as an Independent Liberal-Progressive candidate in St. Clements after losing the party nomination to Stanley Copp by six votes, but he withdrew before election day.  Joseph H. Kachor also entered the contest in Fairford, but also withdrew.

John Solomon (Emerson) 
John Solomon (Emerson) was an incumbent Member of the Legislative Assembly (MLA).  He lost the Emerson Liberal-Progressive nomination to Frank Casper on April 18, 1953, by a vote of 76 to 57, but later alleged that the nomination meeting was improperly convened and entered the contest against Casper.  Solomon's candidacy split the local party association.  The provincial party declared that the nomination meeting was properly convened, and affirmed Casper's candidacy.

Solomon finished in first place on the first count, and defeated Casper on the second count.  Solomon seems to have rejoined the Liberal-Progressive caucus after the election, while Casper later joined the Progressive Conservative Party.  See Solomon's biography page for more information.

Robert Bend (Rockwood) 
Robert Bend (Rockwood) was first elected in the 1949 Manitoba election, as an Independent Progressive Conservative and a supporter of the province's coalition government.  When the Progressive Conservatives left the coalition in 1950, Bend remained a government supporter.  Though he was not an official Liberal-Progressive candidate in 1953, party leader Douglas Campbell spoke at his nomination meeting and the local party organization was solidly behind him.  He was elected on the first count with 1,952 votes.  See his biography page for more information.

Harry Boulette (Rupertsland) 
Harry Boulette (Rupertsland) declared himself a candidate for this vast northern constituency after Roy Brown won the official Liberal-Progressive nomination.  He finished second on the first count with 982 votes (42.62%), and formally lost to Brown on the second count.

Boulette campaigned as an official Liberal-Progressive candidate in the 1959 provincial election, and finished a distant second against Progressive Conservative candidate Joseph Jeannotte.

Rodney S. Clement (Russell) 
Rodney S. Clement (Russell) was elected in 1949 as an independent government supporter.  He continued to support the coalition after 1950, and campaigned in 1953 with support from the official Liberal-Progressive organization.  He finished in first place on the first count, and was subsequently declared elected.  See his biography page for more information.

Joseph G. Van Belleghem (St. Boniface) 
Joseph G. Van Belleghem (St. Boniface) served in the legislative assembly as a Liberal-Progressive from 1949 to 1953, and originally sought renomination with the party in the buildup to the 1953 election.  He was dissatisfied with the nomination process, however, and complained that he was not notified of when meetings were scheduled to occur(Winnipeg Free Press, 24 April 1953).  Van Belleghem withdrew from the nomination race and contested the election as an Independent Liberal-Progressive, against official party candidates Roger Teillet and L. Raymond Fennell.  He finished third on the first ballot with 3,189 votes (16.31%), fell behind on transfers, and was eliminated after the fifth count with 3,932 votes (20.11%).  (St. Boniface was a two-member constituency, with a 33% quota for election.)

James Albert Fletcher (Ste. Rose) 
James Albert Fletcher (Ste. Rose) was a farmer in McCreary, Manitoba.  He finished second on the first count in the 1953 election, receiving 1,083 votes (32.40%).  Official Liberal-Progressive candidate Gildas Molgat was declared elected over Fletcher on the second count.

Fletcher later joined the Progressive Conservative Party, and lost to Molgat under this party's banner in the provincial elections of 1959 and 1962.

E.A. Brotman (Winnipeg North) 
E.A. Brotman (Winnipeg North) was previously an alderman in Winnipeg, representing Ward 3 for the Cooperative Commonwealth Federation.  He later left the CCF to join the Liberal-Progressives, and ran for an LP nomination in the buildup to the 1953 election.  Winnipeg North was a four-member constituency, and the Liberal-Progressives decided to nominate three candidates.  Brotman lost to Alexander Turk, John M. Kozoriz and John J. Kelsch at a delegated meeting on April 15, 1953.

He subsequently entered the contest as an Independent Liberal-Progressive candidate, claiming "The Campbell government has made an excellent record for itself in many ways and one need only mention its acceptance of the provincial-municipal report which gave large financial aid to Winnipeg".  (WFP, 24 April 1953).  He finished sixth on the first count with 1,672 votes (7.50%), and was eliminated after the fifth count with 2,042 votes (9.45%).  The quota for election was 20%.